1812 in sports describes the year's events in world sport.

Boxing
Events
 Tom Cribb retains his English championship.  His only known fight at this time is against "Symonds, the Jew" at Cripplegate in London.

Cricket
Events
 Only one first-class match is recorded as the Napoleonic War takes its toll of cricket's manpower and investment.
England
 Most runs – Lord Frederick Beauclerk 87
 Most wickets – Thomas Howard 8

Horse racing
England
 2,000 Guineas Stakes – Cwrw
 The Derby – Octavius
 The Oaks – Manuella
 St. Leger Stakes – Otterington

References

 
1812